Marumagal is a 1986 Indian Tamil-language film, directed by Karthik Raghunath and produced by Anandavalli Balaji. The film stars Sivaji Ganesan, Suresh, Revathi and Jaishankar. The film was a remake of Hindi film Dulhan Wahi Jo Piya Man Bhaye. It ran for 100 days and a commercial hit

Plot 
Wealthy Chandrasekhar (Sivaji Ganesan) wants to see his only heir, grandson Raja (Suresh) marry a home-loving girl. When he falls seriously ill, his personal doctor (Jaishankar) prevails upon Raja to bring his girl friend home and seek his grandfather's blessings. Since Geetha (Pavithra) is out of town, Raja seeks the help of his friend (Y. G. Mahendra) to find a suitable girl to play act the role until the grandfather gets well. They approach Radha (Revathi), an innocent flower girl, and convince her to pose as Raja's fiancée. While Radha wins over the grandfather and the entire family with her simple charm. Things however get complicated with the arrival of Geetha and her mother (Y. Vijaya) who turns out to be superficial and only interested in the family fortune. While Radha understands the gravity of the situation, cannot reveal the truth and risk putting Chandrasekhar's life in danger.

Cast 
Sivaji Ganesan as Chandrasekhar, an industrialist
Suresh as Raja, Chandrasekhar's grandson
Revathi Menon as Radha and Rajamma painted, Chandrasekhar's wife
Jai Shankar as Dr. Shankar
Y. Vijaya as Malini, Geetha's mother
Y. G. Mahendra as Jagadish, Raja's friend
Manorama
Pavithra as Geetha
Kallapetti Singaram
Ennathe Kannaiah

Soundtrack 
The soundtrack consist of five songs composed by Chandrabose. Lyrics were by Vaali and Pulamaipithan.

Reception
Jayamanmadhan of Kalki cited more than the story, the performances of Ganesan, Revathi and Jaishankar hold the film but felt the director who moved the story without lagging made the climax weak.

References

External links 
 

1980s Tamil-language films
1986 films
Films scored by Chandrabose (composer)
Tamil remakes of Hindi films